The 2019 Atlantic Coast Conference football season, part of the 2019 NCAA Division I FBS football season, is the 67th season of college football play for the Atlantic Coast Conference (ACC). It began on August 29, 2019, and ended on January 13, 2020. The ACC consists of 14 members in two divisions.

The entire 2019 schedule was released on January 16, 2019. The new cable/satellite television channel ACC Network debuted this season, and broadcast 40 regular season games.

Previous season
Clemson defeated Pittsburgh 42–10 in the ACC Football Championship Game. The victory, along with a 12–0 regular season record, earned Clemson a berth in the College Football Playoff.  The Tigers were the number two seed in the playoff and faced Notre Dame in the Cotton Bowl.  The Tigers won this game 30–3 and advanced to the National Championship game where they defeated Alabama 44–16.  With this victory Clemson earned the 2019 College Football National Championship.

Preseason

ACC Kickoff
The 2019 ACC Kickoff was held on July 17 & 18 at the Westin Hotel in Charlotte, North Carolina.  On July 2, 2019, the ACC announced that 28 athletes from the 14 ACC teams would be available for press questions at the Kickoff event.

The Preseason Poll was released on July 22, 2019, after the Kickoff Event. Clemson was elected an overwhelming favorite to repeat as ACC Champions, receiving 170 of 173 Championship votes.

Preseason ACC Player of the Year
Source:

1 Trevor Lawrence, QB, Clemson – 127
2 Travis Etienne, RB, Clemson – 24
3 A. J. Dillon, RB, Boston College – 15
4 Bryce Perkins, QB, Virginia – 6
5 Cam Akers, RB, Florida State – 1

Preseason All-Conference Teams

Offense

Defense

Specialist

Source:

Recruiting classes

Coaches

Coaching changes 
In 2019 the ACC Conference will have 4 new head coaches for the 2019 season.

 On November 11, 2018, Louisville head coach Bobby Petrino was fired after starting the season 2–8.  The interim coach, Lorenzo Ward, was not retained and Scott Satterfield was announced as the new head coach on December 2, 2018.
 On November 25, 2018, North Carolina head coach Larry Fedora was fired and replaced by returning coach Mack Brown.
 On November 28, 2018, Georgia Tech head coach Paul Johnson announced his retirement from coaching effective after Georgia Tech's bowl game. On December 7 it was announced Temple head coach Geoff Collins, a former grad assistant and recruiting coordinator for Georgia Tech, would be the new head coach.
 On December 30, 2018, Miami Hurricanes head coach Mark Richt announced his retirement from coaching and was replaced by Manny Diaz. Diaz was previously the defensive coordinator at Miami and had been hired on December 13, 2018, to be the head coach at Temple.

Head coaching records 

Notes
Records shown are prior to the 2019 season
Years at school includes the 2019 season

Rankings

Schedule
The regular season will begin on August 24 and will end on November 30.  The ACC Championship game is scheduled for December 7, 2019.

Regular season

Week zero

Week one

Week two

Week three

The game between North Carolina and Wake Forest is being played as a non-conference game and will therefore not count in the conference standings. This was done because the two rivals otherwise only play once every six years due to conference divisional alignment.

Week four

Week five

Week six

Week seven

Week eight

Week nine

Week ten

Week eleven

Week twelve

Week thirteen

Week fourteen

Championship game

ACC vs other conferences

ACC vs Power 5 matchups

This is a list of the power conference teams (Big 10, Big 12, Pac-12, Notre Dame and SEC). Although the NCAA does not consider BYU a "Power Five" school, the ACC considers games against BYU as satisfying its "Power Five" scheduling requirement. The designated non-conference game between North Carolina and Wake Forest is not included in this list. All rankings are from the current AP Poll at the time of the game.

ACC vs Group of Five matchups
The following games include ACC teams competing against teams from the American, C-USA, MAC, Mountain West or Sun Belt.

ACC vs FBS independents matchups
The following games include ACC teams competing against FBS Independents, which includes Army, Liberty, New Mexico State, or UMass.

ACC vs FCS matchups

Records against other conferences

Regular Season

Post Season

Postseason

Bowl games

Rankings are from CFP rankings.  All times Eastern Time Zone.  ACC teams shown in bold.

Awards and honors

Player of the week honors

All Conference Teams

Source:

First Team

Second Team

Third Team

ACC Individual Awards

ACC Player of the Year
 Travis Etienne
ACC Rookie of the Year
 Sam Howell
ACC Coach of the Year
Scott Satterfield

ACC Offensive Player of the Year
 Travis Etienne
ACC Offensive Rookie of the Year
 Sam Howell
Jacobs Blocking Trophy
 Mekhi Becton
 

ACC Defensive Player of the Year
Isaiah Simmons
ACC Defensive Rookie of the Year
Gregory Rousseau

All-Americans

Consensus

Associated Press

Walter Camp

FWAA

National Award Winners
 Isaiah Simmons – Butkus Award

Home game attendance

Bold – Exceeded capacity
†Season High

NFL Draft

References